Ranby is a surname. Notable people with the surname include:

John Ranby (1703–1773), English surgeon
John Ranby (1743–1820), English pamphleteer
Mark Ranby (born 1977), New Zealand rugby union player
Sam Ranby (1897–1958), English footballer

See also
Randy